Seikphyu is the principal town and administrative seat for Seikphyu Township in Pakokku District in the Magway Division of Myanmar, on the right (western) bank of the Irrawaddy immediately below its confluence with the Yaw River. It is located across the Irrawaddy river from Chauk and is connected by Anawrahta Bridge. It is situated 34 kilometers south-south-west of ancient Bagan City and 44 kilometers from Nyaung U Airport.

Notes

External links
 
 "Seikpyu Map — Satellite Images of Seikpyu" Maplandia World Gazetteer

Populated places in Magway Region
Township capitals of Myanmar